The Yellow Ticket is a 1931 pre-Code American drama film based on the 1914 play of the same name by Michael Morton, produced by the Fox Film Corporation, directed by Raoul Walsh, and starring Elissa Landi, Lionel Barrymore and Laurence Olivier. Boris Karloff appears briefly in a small supporting role. The picture is also a noteworthy example of productions from the pre-Code era in that it includes brief nudity.

The original play, presented on Broadway, ran from January to June 1914 and starred Lionel's younger brother John Barrymore opposite Florence Reed. This film is the third American adaptation of the play. The first two are The Yellow Passport from 1916 and The Yellow Ticket from 1918. A German version, Der Gelbe Schein, was also filmed and released in 1918.

Plot
When martial law is declared in Russia, all Jews are restricted to their villages. The authorities are unsympathetic to Marya (Elissa Landi), who desperately wants to travel to St. Petersburg to see her dying father. Marya learns that a special card, called "the yellow ticket", is issued to prostitutes and allows them to travel freely.

Marya manages to get a yellow ticket. In St. Petersburg, Baron Andrey (Lionel Barrymore), a corrupt police official, prevents his lecherous nephew, Captain Nikolai, from forcing himself on Marya. She later meets Julian (Laurence Olivier), a British journalist, and tells him about injustices the government has kept him from learning about, including the yellow ticket. When Julian's articles are published, Andrey, a womanizer, guesses that Marya has been giving him information.

Cast

 Elissa Landi as Marya Kalish
 Lionel Barrymore as Baron Igor Andrey
 Laurence Olivier as Julian Rolfe
 Walter Byron as Count Nikolai
 Arnold Korff as Grandfather Kalish
 Mischa Auer as Melchior
 Edwin Maxwell as Police Agent
 Rita La Roy as Fania Rubinstein
 Sarah Padden as Mother Kalish
 Boris Karloff as Orderly

See also
 Boris Karloff filmography
 Laurence Olivier on stage and screen
 The Yellow Passport (1916 film based on same play)
 The Yellow Ticket (1918 film)
 Der Gelbe Schein (1918 German film with Pola Negri; English titles The Yellow Ticket and The Devil's Pawn) 
 The Black Pass (Czarna ksiazeczka, a 1915 lost Polish short by Aleksander Hertz also with Pola Negri)

References

External links
 
 

1931 films
1931 drama films
Fox Film films
American drama films
American black-and-white films
Remakes of American films
Films directed by Raoul Walsh
Films scored by Hugo Friedhofer
Films with screenplays by Jules Furthman
Films about Jews and Judaism
Films set in 1913
Films set in 1914
Films set in Russia
Sound film remakes of silent films
1930s American films